Meet Me In Death Valley is the second studio album by Black Suit Youth. This album received rave reviews upon release. Get Stoked On Music said "Black Suit Youth have unleashed 9 songs that will instantly infect your ears and leave them aching for more." Lead single "Dropout" saw heavy rotation in college radio across the U.S.

Track listing
All songs written by Black Suit Youth

 "Rustland" 3:00
 "Rebel" 3:32
 "Hot Summers In Hi-Fi" 3:25
 "Dropout" 3:31
 "Don't Look Away" 3:34
 "Flatline" 1:20
 "Mosquitos" 3:11
 "Damaged" 3:28
 "Meet Me In Death Valley" 4:03

Personnel

All songs written and performed by Black Suit Youth
Recorded, engineered and mixed by Anthony Santonocito
"Dropout" produced by Tomas Costanza
Recorded at Killingsworth Studios

References

2010 albums